Cengiz Arslan (born 1 June 1996) is a Turkish Greco-Roman wrestler. He won the silver medal in the 72 kg event at the 2019 European Wrestling Championships held in Bucharest, Romania. In the final, he lost against Abuyazid Mantsigov of Russia.

Career 

In 2018, he won the silver medal in the men's 72 kg event at the European U23 Wrestling Championship held in Istanbul, Turkey.

In 2020, he won one of the bronze medals in the 72 kg event at the Individual Wrestling World Cup held in Belgrade, Serbia. He also won one of the bronze medals in his event at the 2021 Wladyslaw Pytlasinski Cup held in Warsaw, Poland.

Achievements

References

External links 

 

Living people
1996 births
Place of birth missing (living people)
Turkish male sport wrestlers
European Wrestling Championships medalists
21st-century Turkish people